Honi may refer to:

People
 Honi HaM'agel, Jewish 1st century BCE scholar prior to the age of the Tannaim
 Charles Coles (1911–1992), American actor and tap dancer nicknamed Honi
 Honi Gordon, American jazz singer
 Serge Honi (born 1973), Cameroonian retired footballer
 Salem el-Honi, high commissioner of the Organisation of the Islamic Conference office

Other uses
 Honi, Iran, a village in Kerman Province
 Honi language, spoken in Yunnan, China
 Honi, fictional daughter in the syndicated comic strip Hägar the Horrible
 Honi, Native Hawaian version of hongi, a traditional Māori greeting

See also 
 Honi phenomenon, a psychological effect
 Honey (disambiguation)